Manuel María Ponce Brousset (April 5, 1874 in Arequipa, Peru – July 18, 1966 in Lima) who briefly served as the President of Peru in August 1930.

After Luis Miguel Sánchez Cerro overthrew Augusto B. Leguía's eleven-year dictatorship in Arequipa, Ponce assumed the two-day interim presidency until Sánchez Cerro arrived in Lima and was designated as Leguía's successor.

References 

1874 births
1966 deaths
Presidents of Peru